Jane A. Rogers is an American actress most known for her role as Dr. Heather Donnelly on NBC's soap opera Santa Barbara. She portrayed the role from 1988 to 1989. She had a short term role as Celeste on General Hospital in 1987, she also played Julie Delorean on The Bold and the Beautiful from 1990 to 1992.

External links
 
 

American television actresses
American soap opera actresses
American film actresses
Living people
21st-century American women
Year of birth missing (living people)